The 1999–2000 NCAA football bowl games concluded the 1999 NCAA Division I-A football season. In the second year of the Bowl Championship Series (BCS) era, Florida State defeated Virginia Tech in the 2000 Sugar Bowl, designated as the BCS National Championship Game for the 1999 season.

A total of 23 bowl games were played between December 18, 1999 and January 4, 2000 by 46 bowl-eligible teams. One new bowl was established for the 1999–2000 season: the Mobile Alabama Bowl (now known as the Dollar General Bowl).

Non-BCS bowls

BCS bowls

References